Philipp Alfons Freiherr Mumm von Schwarzenstein (19 March 1859 – 10 July 1924) (also known as Alfons von Mumm) was a diplomat of the German Empire. He succeeded the murdered Baron Clemens von Ketteler as ambassador in Beijing in 1900.

Mumm studied law at Göttingen University and entered the diplomatic service afterwards. He served in London (1885), Washington D.C. (1888), Bucharest (1892–93), Rome (1893–94), Luxembourg (1898) and again in Washington (1899). During his years in China, he dealt with the Boxer Rebellion and signed The Boxer Protocol on September 7, 1901, on behalf of Germany, maintained an extraordinarily good relation with Empress Dowager Cixi, but also he took many pictures of China in the 1900s  as an amateur photographer. From 1909-11, he was ambassador of the German Reich in Japan. He retired in 1911, but was reactivated 1914 in Berlin.

In March through November 1918, he represented the German Reich in Kiev.

In 1911 he bought and restored a medieval castle in the small village of Portofino, Italy, where he eventually retired in 1920 with his wife Jeannie von Mumm. During the Second World War his then-widow Jeannie is now considered "the saviour" of Portofino because she persuaded Lieutenant Ernst Reimers not to ignite the charges the Germans planned to detonate during their retreat from the village.

Works
 Ein Tagebuch in Bildern (1902), private print scanned by Tōyō Bunko exlibris George Ernest Morrison
 Kriegslyrik (1914–18) in several volumes printed privately
 Mein ligurisches Heim (in Portofino). Mit Freunden für Freunde zusammengestellt und nach eigenen Aufnahmen illustrirt. (private print). Berlin 1915.

Further reading
 
 Régine Thirez: Barbarian Lens: Western Photographers of the Qianlong Emperor's. 1998.

References

Ambassadors of Germany to China
Ambassadors of Germany to Japan
Ambassadors of Germany to Ukraine
German people of the Boxer Rebellion
Barons of Germany
Photographers from Hesse
1859 births
1924 deaths
Commanders of the Order of Christ (Portugal)
Recipients of the Order of the Medjidie, 1st class
Knights Commander of the Order of St Gregory the Great